The ESPY Award for Best College Athlete, Men's Sports, known before 2021 as the Best Male College Athlete ESPY Award, is an annual award honoring the achievements of a male individual from the world of collegiate sports. It was first presented as part of the ESPY Awards in 2002, following the subsumption of the Best College Football Player and Best Male College Basketball Player ESPY Awards, each of which had been presented annually between 1993 and 2001, inclusive. The award trophy, designed by sculptor Lawrence Nowlan, is awarded to the sportsman adjudged to be the best in a given calendar year of those contesting collegiate sport in the United States through the National Collegiate Athletic Association (NCAA). 

From 2004 until its subsumption with the Best Female College Athlete ESPY Award to create the Best College Athlete ESPY Award for the 2018 ceremony, and again since the award was reestablished in 2021, the winner has been chosen by online voting through choices selected by the ESPN Select Nominating Committee. Before that, determination of the winners was made by an panel of experts. Through the 2001 iteration of the ESPY Awards, ceremonies were conducted in February of each year to honor achievements over the previous calendar year; awards presented thereafter are conferred in July and reflect performance from the June previous.

The inaugural winner of the Best Male College Athlete ESPY Award in 2002 was Iowa State Cyclones wrestler Cael Sanderson who ended his collegiate career that year. In that period, he surpassed numerous NCAA records, clinched four NCAA wrestling championships, and went 159–0 undefeated in his final season. Florida Gators quarterback Tim Tebow received the trophy in 2008, and won it again the following year, becoming the only sportsman in the history of the award to have won it more than once. American footballers have been the most successful at the awards with nine victories and 14 nominations, closely followed by basketball players who have been recognized on seven occasions, and were nominated a further 19 times. The most recent winner of the award, and second under its current name, is Alabama Crimson Tide quarterback Bryce Young.

Beginning in 2021, the awards were again separated into men's and women's versions using the current naming scheme.

Winners

Statistics

See also
Best Female College Athlete ESPY Award
Sporting News College Athlete of the Year
National Collegiate Athletic Association awards
ACC Athlete of the Year Award
All-America
Today's Top 10 Award

Notes and references

Notes

References

External links
 

ESPY Awards
College sports trophies and awards in the United States
Awards established in 2002
2002 establishments in the United States